Morris Shea (7 June 1869 – 26 June 1946) was an Australian cricketer. He played four first-class matches for New South Wales in 1895/96.

See also
 List of New South Wales representative cricketers

References

External links
 

1869 births
1946 deaths
Australian cricketers
New South Wales cricketers
Cricketers from Sydney